Alina Smith (born August 25, 1987) is a Russian-American pop singer, songwriter and record producer. She is a co-founder of the music writing and production company Lyre, and she has written and produced songs for artists including Betty Who, Gabbie Hanna, Itzy, Niki and Gabi and Red Velvet.

Early life 
Alina Smith was born in St. Petersburg, Soviet Union. She began singing and playing piano at three, fully conversing in both languages (English and Russian) at four; and composing music and writing poetry and stories from five years old. As a child, she toured with the music group Aurora as a singer.

Career 
In 2010, Sony Japan picked Smith's composition "Fallin' 4 U" to be the debut single from the artist Aisha, featuring Darryl McDaniels of Run DMC. In 2011, Smith's own song "Kissing Tree" was selected for a compilation CD released to raise relief funds after the Japanese earthquake and tsunami. 

In February 2015, country music trade publication MusicRow announced that Smith was signed to a publishing contract with the major label publishing affiliate BMG/Chrysalis in a joint venture with Big Stage Music LLC. Her single "Free Beer" was released for sale on February 17 and selected as upcoming artist/song for play by nationwide satellite channel The Highway (Sirius XM) on its "On the Horizon" program. On March 19, Smith appeared on The Bobby Bones Show podcast to perform her song "Ride".

In 2016, Smith and Elli Moore founded Lyre, a music writing and production company. 

In 2017, Smith wrote "Talk to Me", a track for Red Velvet's EP Rookie, and produced "Bad Weather" by Kirstin Maldonado. In 2018, Smith worked with Gabbie Hanna on her song "Honestly", and produced Niki and Gabi's EP Individual. That same year, Lyre also heavily contributed to Kenzie's EP Phases. Smith also wrote the song "Rocket Girls" for Rocket Girls 101.

In 2019, Smith produced the vocals for Betty Who on her studio album Betty. She was also a writer for Fall Out Boy's "Hands Up."

In 2020, Alina Smith produced the Confections EP, the debut album from the other half of Lyre, Elli Moore . On August 25, Smith released her first single, “Girl That Was Perfect”.

In 2021, Smith co-wrote, "In The Morning", the lead single for Itzy's EP Guess Who.

In 2022, Alina produced Gabi DeMartino's debut studio album, Paintings of Me.

Discography

Extended plays

Singles

References

External links 

1991 births
Living people
Russian emigrants to the United States
American women country singers
American country singer-songwriters
American women pianists
21st-century American singers
21st-century American women singers
21st-century American pianists